The Yunyan Temple or Tiger Hill Temple was a historical temple located on Tiger Hill in Suzhou, in Jiangsu province, China. The temple was founded in 327 and was last rebuilt in 1871. It has suffered damage in successive wars throughout history, and much of the temple was finally destroyed during the Second Sino-Japanese War, which ended in 1945. The grounds of the temple covered most of what is today Tiger Hill park.

Some elements of the temple survive and are important features of the Tiger Hill park. These include the formal entrance to the temple (and today, the formal entrance to the park grounds), its famous, "leaning" pagoda (the Tiger Hill Pagoda), and several other buildings and smaller shrines scattered throughout the park. This Pagoda was extremely important during the Song Dynasty, when it was the center of many religious events, festivals, and worshiping.

Buddhist temples in Suzhou